Federal Route 155, or Jalan Wang Tok Rendong (formerly Kedah state route K186), is a major federal road in Langkawi Island, Kedah, Malaysia.

Features
At most sections, the Federal Route 155 was built under the JKR R5 road standard, allowing maximum speed limit of up to 90 km/h.

List of junctions and town

References

Malaysian Federal Roads
Roads in Langkawi